Tarkhan (Tarxan) is a rural locality (a village) in Sharansky Selsoviet, Sharansky District, Bashkortostan, Russia. The population was 14 as of 2010. There are 5 streets.

Geography 
Tarkhan is located 13 km southeast of Sharan (the district's administrative centre) by road. Stary Tamyan is the nearest rural locality.

References 

Rural localities in Sharansky District